Dorothy Margaret Greig née Hannah (1922–1999) was an English mathematician who worked upon the theory of worsted spinning, especially the superdraft system invented by Geoffrey Ambler.   During WW2, she worked on the analysis of strategic bombing.  She married in 1948 and started lecturing at Leeds University in the same year.  She subsequently lectured at Constantine Technical College and Durham University.

References

1922 births
1999 deaths
Alumni of Newnham College, Cambridge
Spinning
20th-century English mathematicians
Academics of the University of Leeds
Academics of Durham University
Academics of Teesside University